The 1909–10 Massachusetts Agricultural College Aggies men's ice hockey season was the 2nd season of play for the program.

Season
Mass Agg's second season brought them their first winning campaign. The Aggies won 4 games against fellow small schools but the most outstanding game of the year was their 0–11 loss to Williams

Roster

Standings

Schedule and Results

|-
!colspan=12 style=";" | Regular Season

References

UMass Minutemen ice hockey seasons
Massachusetts Agricultural College
Massachusetts Agricultural College
Massachusetts Agricultural College
Massachusetts Agricultural College